Lipotriches fervida is a species of bee in the genus Lipotriches, of the family Halictidae.

References
 https://www.gbif.org/species/119893723
 https://www.itis.gov/servlet/SingleRpt/SingleRpt?search_topic=TSN&search_value=764299
 http://animaldiversity.org/accounts/Lipotriches_fervida/classification/

Halictidae
Insects described in 1875